Chahriq-e Olya (also Romanized as Chahrīq-e ‘Olyā; also known as Chahrīq, Chahriq Qal‘eh, and Qal‘eh-e Chahrīq or Chara) is a village in Chahriq Rural District of Kuhsar District of Salmas County, West Azerbaijan province, Iran. At the 2006 National Census, its population was 680 in 137 households. The following census in 2011 counted 783 people in 179 households. The latest census in 2016 showed a population of 831 people in 202 households; it was the largest village in its rural district.

References 

Salmas County

Populated places in West Azerbaijan Province

Populated places in Salmas County